Aaron Bailey-Nowell (born 10 July 1981) is a New Zealand former basketball player. He debuted in the National Basketball League (NBL) in 2002 with the Wellington Saints and won a championship with them the following year. He played for the Taranaki Airs for the first time in 2004, his first of four stints. He played two seasons for the Manawatu Jets from 2006 and a season with the Auckland Huskies in 2020. In 2013, he helped the NZ Maori team win the FIBA Oceania Pacific Championship while earning the tournament's most valuable player award. He represented New Zealand at FIBA 3x3 tournaments in 2017, 2018 and 2019.

Early life
Bailey-Nowell attended Waitara High School in Waitara, New Zealand, and played junior basketball at Taranaki Basketball Association.

NBL career
Bailey-Nowell debuted in the National Basketball League (NBL) in 2002 with the Wellington Saints and won a championship with the Saints in 2003. He joined the Taranaki Mountainairs in 2004 and continued on with them in 2005. He moved to the Manawatu Jets for the 2006 season and played a second season in 2007.

After spending the 2007–08 Australian NBL season as a training player with the West Sydney Razorbacks, Bailey-Nowell returned to Taranaki in 2008 and played for the Mountainairs every year until 2017. After missing the 2018 season, he re-joined the Mountainairs in 2019.

Bailey-Nowell was set to play for the Mountainairs in 2020 prior to COVID-19. In July 2020, he joined the Auckland Huskies for the rest of the 2020 NBL Showdown as an injury replacement for Taine Murray.

Bailey-Nowell re-joined Taranaki for the 2021 season. In May 2021, he played his 300th NBL game. He re-joined Taranaki, now known as the Airs, for the 2022 season. He retired from the NBL in August 2022.

National team career
In 2006, Bailey-Nowell had a Tall Blacks trial.

In 2013, Bailey-Nowell played for the NZ Maori team in the FIBA Oceania Pacific Championship in Porirua. His two-pointer on the buzzer in the semi-final lifted the team to a 77–75 win over Guam. He finished the match with 25 points and 16 rebounds. In the final, he had 12 points and nine rebounds as the team beat Australia 71–66 to win the tournament. He was subsequently named MVP of the tournament.

In June 2017, Bailey-Nowell travelled to France with the New Zealand 3x3 National Team to compete in the FIBA 3x3 World Cup. He played for the New Zealand 3x3 National Team at the FIBA Asia 3x3 Cup and FIBA 3x3 World Cup in 2018. He competed at the FIBA 3x3 Asia Cup again in 2019.

Personal life
Bailey-Nowell and his wife Melissa have two children.

As of 2021, Bailey-Nowell is a teacher-aid and basketball coach at Waitara High School.

References

External links
Taranaki Airs player profile

1981 births
Living people
Auckland Huskies players
Forwards (basketball)
Manawatu Jets players
People educated at Waitara High School
People from Waitara, New Zealand
Taranaki Airs players
Taranaki Mountainairs players
Wellington Saints players